The Wrath of God is a 1972 American Western film directed by Ralph Nelson and starring Robert Mitchum, Frank Langella, Rita Hayworth and Victor Buono. Filmed in Mexico, it is based on the 1971 novel by Jack Higgins writing as James Graham.

Plot
In 1922, in an unnamed country south of Mexico torn by revolution, Emmet Keogh, an Irish patriot and political assassin, is coerced into transporting a truckload of Scotch whiskey for Englishman Jennings. Along the way, he helps American Catholic priest Oliver Van Horne, who has a flat tire. However, when Keogh reaches his destination, the man he was to deliver the cargo to is dead, killed by Colonel Santilla's men. The men are also about to have their way with a mute Aymara Indian woman named Chela. When Keogh tries to stop them, they decide to hang him. Van Horne shows up just in time, and proceeds to kill Santilla's men with a machine gun. Van Horne, Keogh and Chela flee, but are later caught.

After subjecting Keogh, Van Horne and Jennings (who was smuggling arms, not whiskey) to a mock execution by firing squad, Santilla offers to spare them if they will assassinate Tomas de la Plata, who lives in a well-protected region with his mother. He offers them equal shares of $53,000, found in Van Horne's suitcase. Santilla has already wrangled an invitation for Keogh and Jennings, posing as mining company employees, as de la Plata is anxious to reopen a silver mine. On the way, Keogh is reunited with Chela, who gives him a necklace. Unbeknownst to Keogh, the Aymara are a matriarchal society, and women choose their husbands; they are now married.

De la Plata, however, hates priests, and several have been killed in the town of Mojada, which is under his control. He spares Van Horne once at his religious mother's insistence, but forbids him to perform any priestly functions. Van Horne sets about cleaning the church, assisted by choirboy Pablito. Keogh and Jennings pretend to inspect the mine, while Van Horne comes along to bless it. There is a cave-in, and the three men rescue Senora de la Plata and several miners.

Van Horne defiantly declares that he will hold a mass the next morning to lure de la Plata into an ambush, but when Senora de la Plata shows up for the mass, he aborts his plan. Once again, Senora de la Plata shields him from de la Plata's hatred. It is revealed that de la Plata's father was brutally murdered and his sister and mother violated by Santilla's men, while the corrupt local priest stood by and did nothing.

Van Horne tries again, announcing that he will hold a procession at 9 am the next morning. He also tells the townspeople he will perform marriages and baptisms and hear confessions that night, hoping that they will be grateful enough to join the trio into taking up arms against de la Plata. (It turns out that Van Horne actually was a priest, and a devoted one at that, until a corrupt bishop embittered him.)

The next morning, some of de la Plata's men are killed, but their leader is only wounded. He takes hostages, including Chela and Pablito, and threatens to shoot them, one by one, until Van Horne comes to him. Jurado, de la Plata's second in command, brings Pablito into Mojada and shoots him down in cold blood before Van Horne's eyes. Van Horne, who was about to flee, changes his mind and gives himself up. He manages to kill someone he thinks is de la Plata, but it is only a double. However, Keogh and several Aymara men sneak in; the Irishman blasts the main entrance with grenades, weakening the doors enough for Jennings to drive Van Horne's car through them. The townspeople follow. In the ensuing fight, Jennings blows himself and Jurado up with a grenade. De la Plata is about to kill Keogh, when he is shot by his own mother. He stumbles out and collapses near the stone cross Van Horne has been tied to. Van Horne manages to topple the cross onto de la Plata, killing him.

Cast
 Robert Mitchum as Father Oliver Van Horne
 Frank Langella as Tomas de la Plata
 Rita Hayworth as Senora de la Plata
 John Colicos as Col. Santilla
 Victor Buono as Jennings
 Ken Hutchison as Emmet Keogh 
 Paula Pritchett as Chela
 Gregory Sierra as Jurado
 Frank Ramirez as Carlos Moreno
 Enrique Lucero as Nacho
 Jorge Russek as Cordona
 José Luis Parades as Pablito
 Aurora Clavel as Senora Moreno
 Pancho Cordova as Tacho

Notes
The film is a lighthearted adaptation of the western noir novel The Wrath of God written by Harry Patterson and published under the pseudonym of James Graham in 1971, and later as Jack Higgins.

Alluding to the fact that the film is untroubled by the need for any apparent consistency, film critic Roger Ebert describes it as "a simple, dashing tale told for sheer fun."

Lalo Schifrin's Latin-tinged soundtrack score was described as "jazzy at times, more serious at others – but almost always served up with groovy touches that make this one especially appealing to our ears."

The film marks the final screen appearance by Hayworth, whose health worsened as Alzheimer's disease took hold.

The film was released the same year as Werner Herzog's acclaimed film Aguirre, the Wrath of God.

Production
Actor Ken Hutchison had a near catastrophic accident near the end of filming in which he cut himself on some broken glass, opening a gash from wrist to elbow. He was discovered by Mitchum's wife Dorothy, who applied a life saving tourniquet to stop the bleeding. Since Hutchison was in nearly every scene, the insurance company covering the production shut it down for a month for him to heal. When he returned, he was unable to do anything strenuous, and had to keep the arm covered. With the long layoff, the cast and crew just wanted to get the film done, resulting in confusion, continuity gaps and dislocation.

References

External links
 
 
 
 
 

1972 films
1972 Western (genre) films
American Western (genre) films
Films about Catholicism
Films based on British novels
Films directed by Ralph Nelson
Films set in Central America
Films scored by Lalo Schifrin
Metro-Goldwyn-Mayer films
1970s English-language films
1970s American films